Winfield is an unincorporated community in Franklin Township, Tuscarawas County, Ohio, United States. It is on State Route 516 between Dover and Dundee.

History
Winfield was originally called Mechanicsburg, and under the latter name was platted in 1849. A post office called Winfield was established in 1850, and remained in operation until 1904.

References

Unincorporated communities in Ohio
Unincorporated communities in Tuscarawas County, Ohio